Francesco Bini (born 2 January 1989) is an Italian footballer who plays as a defender for Vigor Carpaneto.

Club career
On 16 July 2019 he joined Serie D club Vigor Carpaneto.

International
He was a member of the Italy under-20 sides that took part at the 2009 Mediterranean Games and the 2009 FIFA U-20 World Cup.

References

External links
 
 FIGC 
 Profile at Football.it 
 

1989 births
Living people
Italian footballers
Italy youth international footballers
Piacenza Calcio 1919 players
U.S. Cremonese players
Reggina 1914 players
Treviso F.B.C. 1993 players
Mantova 1911 players
Serie B players
Serie C players
Association football defenders
People from Empoli
A.C. Gozzano players
Mediterranean Games silver medalists for Italy
Mediterranean Games medalists in football
Competitors at the 2009 Mediterranean Games
Sportspeople from the Metropolitan City of Florence
Footballers from Tuscany